The World Figure Skating Championships is an annual figure skating competition sanctioned by the International Skating Union in which figure skaters compete for the title of World Champion.

Men's competitions took place from March 4th to 5th in London, United Kingdom. Ladies' and pairs' competitions took place from February 2nd to 3rd in Budapest, Hungary.

Results

Men

Judges:
 Mr. Eduard Engelmann jr. 
 Mr. L. Liebermann 
 Mr. André G. Poplimont 
 Mr. Ulrich Salchow 
 Mr. V. C. Wilson

Ladies

Judges:
 Mr. Herbert J. Clarke 
 Mr. Walter Jakobsson 
 Mr. B. Björjeson 
 Mr. Fernand de Montigny 
 Mr, Eduard Engelmann jr.

Pairs

Judges:
 Ms. Ludowika Jakobsson 
 Mr. C. J. Clarke 
 Mr. B. Björjeson 
 Mr. Otto Bohatsch 
 Mr. Theodor Meszléri

Sources
 Result List provided by the ISU

World Figure Skating Championships
World Figure Skating Championships
International figure skating competitions hosted by Hungary
International figure skating competitions hosted by the United Kingdom
World Figure Skating Championships
1920s in Budapest
World Figure Skating Championships
World Figure Skating Championships
International sports competitions in London
World Figure Skating Championships
World Figure Skating Championships
Figure skating in Hungary
International sports competitions in Budapest